Gustaaf "Staftje" Eeckeman (28 November 1918 – 29 March 1975) was a Belgian football left winger.

Career
Eeckeman was born in Bruges.  He joined Cercle Brugge as a youth player in 1928, much to the despair of his family, who all supported Cercle rivals Club Brugge.

Eeckeman made his debut at the highest level of Belgian football in 1934, in a 3–0 win over White Star AC, one of the predecessors of the current FC Brussels. However, his debut was overshadowed by a heavy injury, which left him a long rehabilitation. Eeckeman was only 16 then. At Cercle, he was also infamous for his smoking habits before and after the match.

Staftje Eeckeman was called up for Belgium for the first time in 1940, only a few months before World War II. He received his first of two caps on 17 March, in a 7–1 win against the Netherlands.

When Cercle relegated in 1946, Eeckeman signed with SK Roeselare. However, he left already one season later, when AA Gent offered him a contract and a job as police officer. He ended his career with AS Oostende and a lower league side, Sint-Joris Sportief.  He died in his home city of Bruges.

External links
 Cerclemuseum.be 
 

1918 births
1975 deaths
Belgian Pro League players
Belgian footballers
Belgian police officers
Belgium international footballers
Cercle Brugge K.S.V. players
Association football wingers
K.A.A. Gent players
K.S.V. Roeselare players
Footballers from Bruges